Mohammad Hasan Mamaqani (1822–March 15, 1905) was a leading mujtahid of Najaf in the 19th century. 

He was born and educated in Najaf . He studied with the highest religious authority of his time, Morteza Ansari. His daughter and her son became renowned scholars in their own right, Bibi Khanum (d. 1950) and Mohammad Hadi al-Milani (d. 1975).

He is buried under the iwan of the Husayn shrine.

Further reading
Keddie, Nikki R., Modern Iran: Roots and Results of Revolution, Yale University Press, 2003.
Momen, Moojan, An Introduction to Shiʻi Islam: The History and Doctrines of Twelver Shiʻism, Yale University Press, 1985.

See also
Grand Ayatollah Mohammad Hadi Milani
Grand Ayatollah Mohammad Kazem Shariatmadari

Iraqi ayatollahs
1822 births
1905 deaths